6-Hydroxymellein is a dihydroisocoumarin, a phenolic compound found in carrots. It has also been isolated in Aspergillus terreus and shows an inhibition of pollen development in Arabidopsis thaliana.

Biosynthesis 
6-Methoxymellein is formed from S-adenosyl methionine and 6-hydroxymellein by the enzyme 6-hydroxymellein O-methyltransferase with secondary production of S-adenosylhomocysteine.

References 

Dihydroisocoumarins
Lactones